Mark Francis Brzezinski (born April 7, 1965) is an American lawyer serving as the United States Ambassador to Poland since 2022. He previously served as the United States Ambassador to Sweden from 2011 to 2015 under President Barack Obama.

The son of Zbigniew Brezinski, former US National Security Advisor to President Jimmy Carter, Brezinski attended Dartmouth College, the University of Virginia Law School, and St. Antony's College, Oxford.

Early life and education
Brzezinski is the son of Emilie Benes Brzezinski and Polish-born former National Security Advisor Zbigniew Brzezinski, and the grandson of Polish diplomat Tadeusz Brzeziński. His mother is the grandniece of former Czechoslovak president Edvard Beneš. His sister is Mika Brzezinski, co-host of the morning talk show Morning Joe, and his brother is military expert Ian Brzezinski. He is also first cousin of author Matthew Brzezinski.

Brzezinski graduated from Dartmouth College with a Bachelor of Arts in government, earned a Juris Doctor from the University of Virginia Law School, and holds a Doctor of Philosophy in political science from Oxford University. He also earned a Fulbright Scholarship to study the Constitutional Tribunal of the Republic of Poland.

Career

Brzezinski was a corporate and securities associate at Hogan & Hartson LLP in Washington, D.C. from 1996-1999. From 1999-2001, Brzezinski served in the Clinton administration as a director of Russian/Eurasian affairs and director of Southeast European affairs of the National Security Council at the White House. In that capacity, he was White House coordinator for U.S. democracy and rule of law assistance programs for the region. 

Brzezinski was a foreign policy advisor to the presidential campaign of Barack Obama, and was later appointed Ambassador to Sweden by Obama.

Ambassador to Poland

On May 26, 2021, The New York Times reported that President Joe Biden is considering nominating Brzezinski to be the United States Ambassador to Poland. Brzezinski was officially nominated on August 4. On August 9, 2021, his nomination was sent to the Senate. Hearings on his nomination were held before the Senate Foreign Relations Committee on December 1, 2021. His nomination was favorably reported by the committee on December 15, 2021, and was confirmed by the Senate on December 18, 2021 by voice vote.

Brzezinski was sworn in as the United States Ambassador to Poland on January 19, 2022 by Vice President Kamala Harris. He presented his credentials to President Andrzej Duda on February 22, 2022.

Awards 
In 2007 President of Poland Lech Kaczyński decorated him with Officer's Cross of the Order of Merit of the Republic of Poland. The order was awarded "for outstanding contributions to the development of Polish-American relations and for promoting a positive image of Poland in the world".

Personal life
His first wife was Carolyn M. Campbell, a lawyer. His second wife, from 2008, was Natalia Brzezinski, née Lopatniuk.

References

External links

Profile at the Globalist
Profile at McGuireWoods 

 
|-

 
1965 births
Living people
University of Virginia School of Law alumni
Dartmouth College alumni
Ambassadors of the United States to Sweden
Ambassadors of the United States to Poland
Alumni of St Antony's College, Oxford
American people of Czech descent
American people of Polish descent
Mark
Washington, D.C., Democrats
Lawyers from Washington, D.C.
Place of birth missing (living people)
21st-century American diplomats
Fulbright alumni